The Visayan bulbul (Hypsipetes guimarasensis) or Steere's bulbul, is a songbird species in the bulbul family, Pycnonotidae.

It is endemic to the western Visayas in the Philippines. Its natural habitats are subtropical or tropical moist lowland forests and subtropical or tropical moist montane forests.  Until 2010, it was considered to be a subspecies of the Philippine bulbul.

Taxonomy and description 
The Visayan bulbul was originally described in the genus Iole and has also been classified by some authorities as a separate species in the genus Ixos. Until 2010, it was considered to be a subspecies of the Philippine bulbul but others still maintain that this is just a sub-species.

EBird describes the bird as "A medium-sized bird of lowland and montane forest and more open wooded areas in the west-central Philippines. Dark brown above with a grayish-brown streaked crown, a white belly, white under the base of the tail, and a warm reddish-brown throat and chest. Somewhat similar to Negros jungle-flycatcher and White-vented whistler but considerably bigger, with a longer bill and no white throat. Song is a metallic up-and-down melody ending in a jumble. Also gives some screeching calls."

Habitat and conservation status 
It is adaptable to a wide range of habitats including  primary and secondary forest, shrubby clearings and even cultivated areas (provided there's still some tree cover).  It is found in both lowland and montane areas up to 2,000 m ASL.  

The IUCN Red List views this as a subspecies. While there is no formal evaluation for the Visayan bulbul, it's adaptability to multiple habitats make it an abundant bird.

References

Visayan bulbul
Endemic birds of the Philippines
Fauna of the Visayas
Visayan bulbul
Taxa named by Joseph Beal Steere